This is a list of television programs currently broadcast (in first-run or reruns), scheduled to be broadcast or formerly broadcast on Disney Channel (formerly "The Disney Channel"), that are of Canadian origin.

Drama series

Live-action preschool programming

Animated series

Playhouse Disney/Disney Junior Programming

References

Disney Channel
Disney-related lists
Disney Channel original programming